Arkadiusz Moryto (born 31 August 1997) is a Polish handball player for Industria Kielce and the Polish national team.

He participated at the 2017 World Men's Handball Championship,  as well as in the 2020 and 2022 European Men's Handball Championship.

References

External links

1997 births
Living people
Sportspeople from Kraków
Polish male handball players
Vive Kielce players